NarTausha Annette "Tausha" Mills (born February 29, 1976) is a former professional basketball player who played on multiple teams in the WNBA.

She played a total of 99 games.

Career statistics

College

Regular season

|-
| style="text-align:left;"|2000
| style="text-align:left;"|Washington
| 31 || 0 || 9.5 || .438 || .000 || .745 || 2.6 || 0.3 || 0.3 || 0.3 || 1.2 || 4.2
|-
| style="text-align:left;"|2001
| style="text-align:left;"|Washington
| 30 || 0 || 10.6 || .333 || .000 || .581 || 3.5 || 0.2 || 0.5 || 0.1 || 0.8 || 2.1
|-
| style="text-align:left;"|2002
| style="text-align:left;"|Washington
| 4 || 0 || 4.3 || .000 || .000 || .000 || 0.8 || 0.0 || 0.3 || 0.0 || 0.5 || 0.0
|-
| style="text-align:left;"|2003
| style="text-align:left;"|San Antonio
| 29 || 0 || 6.4 || .408 || .000 || .581 || 1.9 || 0.2 || 0.1 || 0.1 || 1.8 || 2.0
|-
| style="text-align:left;"|2007
| style="text-align:left;"|Detroit
| 5 || 1 || 10.2 || .286 || .000 || .750 || 3.6 || 0.4 || 0.0 || 0.0 || 1.2 || 3.0
|-
| style="text-align:left;"|Career
| style="text-align:left;"|5 years, 3 teams
| 99 || 1 || 8.8 || .383 || .000 || .647 || 2.6 || 0.2 || 0.3 || 0.1 || 0.9 || 2.7

Playoffs

|-
| style="text-align:left;"|2000
| style="text-align:left;"|Washington
| 2 || 0 || 10.5 || .571 || .000 || .375 || 1.5 || 0.0 || 0.0 || 0.0 || 1.5 || 5.5

References

1976 births
Living people
Alabama Crimson Tide women's basketball players
American expatriate basketball people in China
American expatriate basketball people in Israel
American expatriate basketball people in Poland
American expatriate basketball people in Turkey
American women's basketball players
Basketball players from Dallas
Centers (basketball)
Chicago Condors players
Detroit Shock players
Henan Phoenix players
San Antonio Stars players
Trinity Valley Cardinals women's basketball players
Washington Mystics draft picks
Washington Mystics players